{{Infobox award
| name = 2021 MTV Movie & TV Awards
| image = 2021-mtv-movie-tv-awards-logo.png
| imagesize = 250px
| date = 
| location = Hollywood Palladium,Los Angeles, California
| country = United States
| host = Leslie Jones (May 16) Nikki Glaser (May 17)
| most_awards = WandaVision (4)
| most_nominations = WandaVision (6)
| most_wins = WandaVision (4)
| network = MTV
| previous = 2019(2020 skipped)
| main = 
| next = 2022
}}
The 2021 MTV Movie & TV Awards were an awards presentation held on May 16 and 17, 2021 at the Hollywood Palladium in Los Angeles. It was the 29th edition of the MTV Movie & TV Awards, and the fourth to jointly honor movies and television.

The presentation was held as a two-night event; comedian and actress Leslie Jones hosted the first night, which were dedicated to awards for film and scripted television. Comedian Nikki Glaser hosted the second night, MTV Movie & TV Awards: Unscripted, which were devoted to awards for reality television.

Winners and nominees
The full list of nominees was announced on April 19, 2021. Best Music Documentary nominees were announced on May 10, 2021, followed by Best Musical Moment on May 11, 2021. All winners are listed first, in bold.

Scripted Awards

Unscripted Awards
{| class="wikitable" style="width:100%"
|-
! style="background:#EEDD82; width:50%" | Best Music Documentary
! style="background:#EEDD82; width:50%" | Best Docu-Reality Show
|-
| valign="top" |
 BTS – Break the Silence: The Movie
 Ariana Grande: Excuse Me, I Love You
 Framing Britney Spears
 The Bee Gees: How Can You Mend a Broken Heart
 Biggie: I Got a Story to Tell
 Billie Eilish: The World's a Little Blurry
 Demi Lovato: Dancing with the Devil
 Tina
 Shawn Mendes: In Wonder
 Taylor Swift: Miss Americana
| valign="top" |
 Jersey Shore: Family Vacation
 Below Deck Mediterranean
 Black Ink Crew: New York
 Bling Empire
 Love & Hip Hop: Atlanta
|-
! style="background:#EEDD82; width:50%" | Best Dating Show
! style="background:#EEDD82; width:50%" | Best Reality Cast
|-
| valign="top" |
 The Bachelorette
90 Day Fiancé
 Ex On The Beach
 Love Is Blind
 Ready to Love
| valign="top" |
 RuPaul's Drag Race
 90 Day Fiancé
 Jersey Shore: Family Vacation
 Love & Hip Hop: Atlanta
 The Real Housewives of Atlanta
|-
! style="background:#EEDD82; width:50%" | Best Competition Series
! style="background:#EEDD82; width:50%"| Best Lifestyle Show
|-
| valign="top" |
 RuPaul's Drag Race
 The Circle
 The Challenge
 Legendary
 The Masked Singer
| valign="top" |
 Nailed It!
 Deliciousness
 Fixer Upper: Welcome Home
 Making the Cut
 Queer Eye
|-
! style="background:#EEDD82; width:50%"| Best New Unscripted Series
! style="background:#EEDD82; width:50%"| Best Talk/Topical Show
|-
| valign="top" |
 Selena + Chef
 Bling Empire
 Cardi Tries
 The Real Housewives of Salt Lake City
 VH1 Family Reunion: Love & Hip Hop Edition
| valign="top" |
 The Daily Show with Trevor Noah
 The Breakfast Club
 A Little Late with Lilly Singh
 Red Table Talk
 Watch What Happens Live with Andy Cohen
|-
! style="background:#EEDD82; width:50%"| Best Comedy/Game Show
! style="background:#EEDD82; width:50%"| Best Host
|-
| valign="top" |
 Impractical Jokers
 Floor is Lava
 Kids Say the Darndest Things
 Ridiculousness
 Wild 'n Out
| valign="top" |
 RuPaul – RuPaul's Drag Race
 Nicole Byer – Nailed It!
 Rob Dyrdek – Ridiculousness
 Tiffany Haddish – Kids Say the Darndest Things
 T. J. Lavin – The Challenge
|-
! style="background:#EEDD82; width:50%"| Breakthrough Social Star
! style="background:#EEDD82; width:50%"| Best Real-Life Mystery or Crime Series
|-
| valign="top" |
 Bretman Rock
 Addison Rae
 Jalaiah Harmon
 Charli D'Amelio
 Rickey Thompson
| valign="top" |
 Catfish: The TV Show
 Evil Lives Here
 Night Stalker: The Hunt for a Serial Killer
 Tiger King
 Unsolved Mysteries
|-
! style="background:#EEDD82; width:50%"| Best Fight
! style="background:#EEDD82" |Best International Reality Series
|-
| valign="top" |
 "Kourtney Kardashian vs. Kim Kardashian West" – Keeping Up With The Kardashians
 "Chrishell Stause vs. Christine Quinn" — Selling Sunset
 "Jackie Goldschneider vs. Teresa Giudice" – The Real Housewives of New Jersey
 "Kandy Muse vs. Tamisha Iman" – RuPaul's Drag Race: Untucked
 "Law Roach vs. Guest Judge Dominique Jackson" – Legendary
| valign="top" |
 Love Island (UK)
 Acapulco Shore
 Geordie Shore
 Nailed It! (Mexico)
 RuPaul's Drag Race UK
|}

Comedic Genius Award
 Sacha Baron Cohen

MTV Generation Award
 Scarlett Johansson

MTV Reality Royalty Lifetime Achievement
 Jersey Shore: Family Vacation

Multiple nominations

Film
The following movies received multiple nominations:
 Three – Borat Subsequent Moviefilm
 Two – Birds of Prey, Judas and the Black Messiah, Promising Young Woman, To All the Boys: Always and Forever

Television
The following television series received multiple nominations:
 Six – WandaVision
 Four – The Boys, Bridgerton
 Three – Cobra Kai, Emily in Paris, RuPaul's Drag Race, The Mandalorian
 Two – 90 Day Fiancé, Jersey Shore: Family Vacation, Kids Say the Darndest Things, Legendary, Love & Hip Hop: Atlanta, Nailed It!, Ridiculousness, The Challenge, The Falcon and the Winter Soldier

Appearances and Presenters

Scripted
 Mandy Moore and Justin Hartley – presented Best Hero
 Lin-Manuel Miranda, Anthony Ramos, Corey Hawkins, Leslie Grace and Melissa Barrera – introduced In the Heights preview
 Yvonne Orji and Eric Andre – presented Best Performance in a Show
 Jurnee Smollett – presented Best Breakthrough Performance
 Billy Porter – honoured Scarlett Johansson with the Generation Award
 Scarlett Johansson – introduced Black Widow preview 
 Addison Rae and Tanner Buchanan – presented Best Kiss
 Nasim Pedrad – presented Comedic Performance
 Jacob Elordi - presented Best Fight
 Riley Keough and Taylour Paige – presenter Best Duo
 Tom Hiddleston – introduced Loki preview 
 Seth Rogen – honoured Sacha Baron Cohen with the Comedic Genius Award
 Chase Stokes, Madelyn Cline, Madison Bailey, Jonathan Daviss and Rudy Pankow – presented Best Villain
 Anthony Mackie – presented Most Frightened Performance
 Patrick Wilson and Vera Farmiga – introduced The Conjuring: The Devil Made Me Do It preview
 Antonia Gentry – presented Best Musical Moment
 Yara Shahidi – presented Best Performance in a Movie
 Ralph Macchio and William Zabka – presented Best Movie
 Henry Golding - introduced Snake Eyes: G.I. Joe Origins preview
 Leslie Jones - presented Best Show

Unscripted
 Heidi Klum and Winnie Harlow – presented Best Reality Cast
 Ray J and Princess Love – presenter Best Dating Show
 Nikki Bella and Brie Bella – presented Best Fight
 Paris Hilton – honoured Jersey Shore cast with Reality Royalty Award
 Tayshia Adams – presented Best Talk/Topical Show
 The D'Amelio Family – introduced "Meet the D'Amelio's" preview and presented Best Host
 Bretman Rock – presented Best New Unscripted Series
 Erika Jayne, Gottmik and Symone – presented Breakthrough Social Star
 Chrishell Stause, Mary Fitzgerald and Heather Young – presented Best Lifestyle Show
 Christine Chiu & Anna Shay – presented Best Competition Series
 Christine Quinn – presented Best Comedy/Game Show 
 Kyle Richards – presented Docu-Best Reality Show

Ceremony information
MTV did not announce or hold a 2020 edition of the ceremony due to the COVID-19 pandemic. MTV announced on March 11, 2021 that the ceremony would be scheduled for May 16 and 17, 2021, with the first night to focus on films and scripted television, and the second (titled MTV Movie & TV Awards: Unscripted) to focus on unscripted and reality television.

References

External links
 MTV Movie & TV Awards official site

MTV Movie
MTV Movie Awards
2021 in American cinema
2021 in American television
MTV Movie Awards
MTV Movie & TV Awards